This is a list of the 21 members of the European Parliament for Belgium in the 2019 to 2024 session.

Note that at the time of the election, Forward (Vooruit) was still named Socialist Party - Differently (Socialistische Partij - Anders).

References 

Lists of Members of the European Parliament 2019–2024
Lists of Members of the European Parliament for Belgium
MEPs for Belgium 2019–2024